Events from the year 1774 in Ireland.

Incumbent
Monarch: George III

Events
17 September – Clifton House, Belfast, the Belfast Charitable Society's poorhouse, is opened.
New buildings in Armagh provided by Archbishop Richard Robinson are completed for the County Infirmary, Royal School and Military Barracks.

Births
7 May – Francis Beaufort, hydrographer and officer in the British Royal Navy,  creator of the Beaufort scale (died 1857).
11 July – Somerset Lowry-Corry, 2nd Earl Belmore, politician and statesman (died 1841).
29 December – Maurice FitzGerald, 18th Knight of Kerry, Whig politician (died 1849).
Full date unknown
Máire Bhuí Ní Laoghaire, poet (d.c1849).
Bartholomew Teeling, a leader of the Irish forces during the Irish Rebellion of 1798 (died 1798).

Deaths
4 April – Oliver Goldsmith, novelist and playwright (born 1728 or 1730).
11 July – Sir William Johnson, 1st Baronet, pioneer and army officer in colonial New York (born 1715).
14 July – Field Marshal James O'Hara, 2nd Baron Tyrawley, officer in the British Army (born 1682).
27 December – Henry Mossop, actor (born 1729).
Sir Robert Blackwood, 1st Baronet (born 1694).

References

 
Years of the 18th century in Ireland
Ireland
1770s in Ireland